Henry Winfield Watson (June 24, 1856 – August 27, 1933) was a Republican member of the U.S. House of Representatives from Pennsylvania.

Henry W. Watson was born in Bucks County, Pennsylvania. He was educated in private schools, studied law, was admitted to the bar in 1881, and commenced the practice of his profession in Philadelphia. He served as president of the Washington, Potomac & Chesapeake Railway Company. He was the director of several banks and of the Langhorne Water Company.

Watson was elected as a Republican to the Sixty-fourth and to the nine succeeding Congresses and served until his death in Langhorne, Pennsylvania. Interment in the Wilmington and Brandywine Cemetery, Wilmington, Delaware.

See also 
 List of United States Congress members who died in office (1900–49)

Sources 
 
 The Political Graveyard

External links

1856 births
1933 deaths
Burials at Wilmington and Brandywine Cemetery
People from Bucks County, Pennsylvania
Republican Party members of the United States House of Representatives from Pennsylvania